Morning Star Lake is located in Glacier National Park, in the U. S. state of Montana. The lake is situated along the North Fork Cut Bank Creek drainage.

See also
List of lakes in Glacier County, Montana

References

Lakes of Glacier National Park (U.S.)
Lakes of Glacier County, Montana